Cornish Hall End is on the B1057 road three miles north of Finchingfield and  south of Steeple Bumpstead in the Braintree district of Essex, England.  The main part of the village is a ribbon development of about 60 houses on either side of the road with many outlying farms, hamlets and individual houses.

Cornish Hall End is served by a Parish Council which also represents Finchingfield.

Its neighbouring villages are Finchingfield, Stambourne, and the Sampfords (Great Sampford and Little Sampford). Near the village at Herkstead Hall Farm is one of the sources of the River Colne, Essex. It was one of the places studied in the Survey of English Dialects. It is also situated in the small region where the flora Oxlip grows.

Villages in Essex
Finchingfield